Four color cards is a game of the rummy family of card games, with a relatively long history in southern China. In Vietnam the equivalent game is known as tứ sắc (Sino-Vietnamese pronunciation of 四色).

History 
The game is similar to various Chinese draw-and-discard card games played since the 18th century. The deck for this particular game originated in the 19th century based on Xiangqi pieces on which the names of said pieces are printed on the cards. The cards were typically used by the lower class to play gambling games, and were intended to be easy and cheap to make because, as gambling was illegal in China, there was a need for cards that could be easily hidden or disposed of. Due to the Chinese Revolution and the fact that the game was typically enjoyed by lower classes, written rules for the game were difficult to find. Therefore, the official rules may vary depending on the region and household.

Deck 
A standard deck consists of 112 cards, divided into four colors, 28 cards each, depicting the seven Chinese chess pieces. In each color there are cards printed with each of the seven pieces of Xiangqi, repeated four times each, like in Mahjong.

 General （帥 shuài or 將 jiàng in Chinese）
 Advisor (仕 or 士, pinyin: shì)
 Elephant (象 or 相, pinyin: xiàng)
 Chariot (車 or 俥, pinyin: jū )
 Horseman (馬 or 傌, mǎ)
 Cannon (炮 or 包 or 砲, all read pào)
 Soldier (兵 bīng or 卒 zú)

Objective 
The objective of this game is very similar to mahjong, which is to achieve a winning hand consisting of melds of the following arrangements. Each player has 20 cards at the start of the game, and a winning hand has 21 cards. Each winning hand must have an odd number of points, which can be used as a rough guide for players to check in case they are short of cards or have extra cards.

Setup 
The standard variation of the game is played by four players, although it can be played with two or three. If there are more players, an extra card set is added for each additional player. For example, for five players, a deck (112 cards) and an extra card set (28 cards) is used.

For the first game, a dealer is chosen by an arbitrary method. A typical method is for everyone to draw randomly one card from a face down pile to compare ranks, with the highest rank being the dealer. For subsequent games, the winner of the previous game will be the dealer, and the player across of the winner will do the job of shuffling cards to set up the draw pile.

The dealer is in charge of handing out cards. Typically, they would deal six to themselves first, then go counterclockwise around the table giving five at a time, until a hand of 20 cards is dealt to each player (or 21 in the dealer's case). The dealer has an extra card because they must begin play by throwing out the first card.

The remaining cards are collected and placed in a stack at a central location and becomes the Draw Pile. Future draws are always taken from one end of the Draw Pile.

Typically, a player holds their cards arranged in a fan. Inexperienced players and children may be allowed to put their cards face down on the table. For example, some players can take pre-existing melds that they do not plan to touch and put them in one big facedown stack next to them.

If a player is in possession of a triple or quadruple in their starting hand (three or four cards of the same color and rank), they must indicate it with a marker. Common markers are stones or coins.

Play 
Most turns consist of the following sequences of steps, described in detail below:

1. Draw.
2. Meld.
3. Discard.

1. Draw 
The player may either take the top card from the previous player's discard pile (see modifications below) or take the top card of the Draw Pile. If the card is taken from a previous player, it must be used right away (see Step 2). The card must be flipped face up in front of them for all to see. The player does not take the card into their hand.

2. Meld 
The player may, if they wish, bring out cards from their hand to meld (create a meld) with the drawn card. They may bring out any number of cards up to three and including zero as long as exactly one meld is created that includes the drawn card. Determining who gets to meld the card is done by comparing the priority conditions as described below. The meld is left face up on the table. The player cannot use cards that are not in their hand to meld. Specifically, they cannot use previously opened melds, but they can break up or use melds in their hand.

If, after a meld, a player's hand consists completely of melds or is empty, the player can declare that they have won, and display their hand. The current game is then over and the hand is scored (see below).

3. Discard 
If the player decided to meld the drawn card, they may then discard any card they wish from their hand. It is laid face-up on their right hand side so that all players can see it. This becomes that player's discard pile. If the player decided not to or was unable to meld the draw, they must discard the draw. In practice, Generals are never discarded (due to their one-meld nature giving 1 point), and it is reasonable to make a ruling that Generals cannot be discarded.

If, after a discard, a player's hand consists completely of melds or is empty, the player has NOT won, since they have only 20 cards. That player needs another meld to win.

After the Discard, the next player sitting to the right (anti-clockwise), begins their turn.

This is the basic sequence of play.

Modifications 

However, there are two other modifications to play that can change this sequence, specifically,

 Melding another's Draw; and
 Melding another's Discard.

Under certain conditions, a player can meld another player's draw or discard card by "stealing" the card. Play immediately shifts to the player who claimed the card, who then treats the situation as if they had just melded a card, and then discards a card. Play then proceeds to the right of that person, as normal. As a consequence of this, players in between may lose their turn, and a player may even lose the chance to meld their own draw.

When in conflict, a lower number (1) takes priority over a higher number (4).

1. A person winning after receiving a discard or on their own draw takes priority over anything below. They should meld with the card, announce that they have won out loud, and display their cards to count points and verify the win.
2. If a draw or discard is needed to win immediately by any player completing any type of meld, that player must announce it and can meld the other person's card to win. If several players call it out, the player whose turn would come first in normal order gets priority. That player must then display their hand to count points and verify the win.
3. If a draw or discard is needed to finish a Quad (not a Four-Footman Group), the player announces that they currently possess a triple and can meld the other person's card. If the card is needed to finish a Triple, the player announces that they currently possess a double and can meld the other person's card. Any player may "steal" a card this way regardless of whose turn it is. Melds done in this manner must be displayed face up on the table as with any other meld and the game continues with the melding player discarding a card.
4. If the card is needed to finish a Group (Command, Field, Three-Footman, or Four-Footman) or a One-card meld (but not a Pair, a player may claim it after having just drawn that card. A card cannot be "stolen" to complete a Group unless it is to win (see condition 2).

Note that a player may not complete a one card meld (namely the one card General meld) from another player's draw or discard unless it is for a win. Naturally, this means that a player who draws up a General card has to discard another card from the hand and not discard the drawn General card, unless another player has a triple of the said General card in hand and wishes to make a Quad (to get more points). Because a General is inherently worth a point on its own, some variations of the rules do not allow stealing a General under any circumstances, even if a player is completing a Quad, unless it is for an immediate win.

Melds and scoring

One-card meld (general) 

Hidden (1 point)
Exposed (1 point)

This meld can only be formed using the General card. Thus every General card is a one-card meld by itself unless combining them together to make a Quadruple allows the player to get more points. Every one-card meld scores one point, whether it is exposed or in the player's hand.

Two-card meld 
Hidden (0 points)
Exposed (0 points)

Example:  or 

This meld can only be formed with any two identical cards (same character and color). However, this meld scores no points and therefore, two General cards are almost always treated separately as one-card melds to score one point each for a total of two points. For the non-General cards, players often aim to complete a three-card meld by calling "Pong" when a third identical card is drawn by oneself or the opponent.

It is important to note that cards with identical characters but different colors cannot be used to form two-card melds.

Invalid meld example:

Three-card meld 
There are a couple of types for three-card melds:

Command group 
Hidden (1 point)
Exposed (1 point)

Example:  or 

This meld consists of a General, Advisor, and Elephant in the same suit (color). This scores one point whether it is exposed or in the player's hand. Thus there is no reason for the General card to be used in this way unless it is to achieve the winning hand quickly and the player has enough points from other melds.

Invalid meld example:

Field group 
Hidden (1 point)
Exposed (1 point)

Example:  or 

This meld consists of a Chariot, Horseman, and Cannon in the same suit (color). This scores one point whether it is exposed or in the player's hand.

Invalid meld example:

Triple 
Hidden (3 points)
Exposed (1 point)

Example:  or 

Analogous to the pong in mahjong, this meld is formed by three identical cards (in both suit and rank). This scores one point when it is exposed and three points when in the player's hand (with the exception of the General card). A triple of the General card scores three points whether it is exposed or in the player's hand (treat each General card as a one-card meld).

Three different color group 
Hidden (1 point)
Exposed (1 point)

Example:  or 

This meld consists of three identical cards in rank but in different colors. It scores one point whether it is exposed or in the player's hand.

Four-card meld 
There are a couple of types for four-card melds:

Quadruple 
Hidden (8 points)
Exposed (6 points)

Example:  or 

Analogous to the kong in mahjong, this meld is formed by four identical cards (in both suit and rank).  This scores six points when it is exposed and eight points when in the player's hand. This is the only scenario where the General card should not be treated separately as one-card melds since a quadruple scores more points than the four points of the four one-card melds.

Complete color group 
Hidden (4 points)
Exposed (4 points)

Example:  or 

This meld consists of four identical cards in rank but in different colors. It scores four points whether it is exposed or in the player's hand.

Reshuffling 
A player who does not have at least one of the following is entitled to declare the current round void and redeal all hands:

 One-card Meld of the General (1 point)
 Three-card Meld of the Triple (3 points)
 Four-card Meld of the Quadruple (8 points) or Complete Color Group (4 points)

Etiquette 
Players are expected to call out drawn cards and discards as they are shown. It is considered poor etiquette to:

 delay a call just to see what the player will do with a draw.
 refuse a player's priority call on your drawn card, even if you have already melded it—players should meld their drawn cards only after everyone has had a chance to see it, but if they don't, it's their own fault.
 make a call on a draw or discard after the next draw or discard has been made, i.e., no retroactive calls.

See also 
Gnau
Zi pai

External links
Four color cards rules
Four color cards rules

Chinese card games
Gambling games
Rummy